Piešťany is a town in Slovakia. It is located in the western part of the country within the Trnava Region and is the seat of its own district. It is the biggest and best known spa town in Slovakia and has around 28,000 inhabitants.

Etymology
The name Piešťany comes from Slovak Piesok (sand), referring to local sandbanks. The etymology is straightforward – Piešťanci – people who live on the sandy site and Piešťany – their settlement.

History

The first human settlement in the area is dated to the prehistoric times, about 80,000 years ago. People were attracted to the site by abundance of game in the vicinity of the thermal springs that did not freeze in winter.

A small female statue called Venus of Moravany was found in the nearby village Moravany nad Váhom. It is made of mammoth ivory and is dated to 22,800 BC. It currently resides in the Bratislava Castle museum. In another nearby village, Krakovany-Stráže, a treasure consisting of luxury items made of glass, bronze, silver, and gold was discovered in three graves from 200–300 AD. The surroundings of Piešťany also include the Great Moravian castle of Ducové.

Piešťany was first mentioned in written records in 1113 (under the name Pescan). At that time it consisted of several smaller settlements. The medicinal springs were already popular in the Middle Ages. They were visited by the Hungarian king Matthias Corvinus. The first book mentioning the Piešťany springs was De admirandis Hungariae aquis hypomnemation (About the Miraculous Waters of the Hungarian Monarchy) by Georgius Wernher, published in 1549 in Basel. In the 16th century, the Piešťany spa was also mentioned by two prominent physicians, Johann Crato de Crafheim (who served to several Holy Roman Emperors) and Andrea Baccius Elpidianus (a personal surgeon of the Pope). But in the 16th and 17th centuries, Piešťany also suffered from Turkish raids and anti-Habsburg uprisings.

Throughout the centuries Piešťany was owned by several noble families; the last of them, the Erdődys, owned the area from  1720 to 1848, and the spa until 1940. The Erdődy family built the first spa buildings in 1778. They were damaged by a destructive flood in 1813. In 1820 the spa buildings were expanded and remodeled in neo-classical style and named Napoleon spa. The Erdődy family also established the Spa park in this period. In the years 1889 to 1940 the Winter family rented the spa from the Erdődys and brought it to international fame.  improved spa treatment as well as accommodation and entertainment for visitors. They built several spa buildings and hotels.

The spa attracted many aristocratic visitors, including Ludwig van Beethoven. In 1917, three monarchs (Wilhelm II of Germany, Karl I of Austria-Hungary, and Ferdinand I of Bulgaria) orchestrated their war strategy during the negotiations in the Thermia Palace hotel.

In 1945 Piešťany received the official status of a town. In 1959, Sĺňava water reservoir was built south of the town. In the late 1960s and 1970s more spa buildings were built. In 1973 the village of Banka, located on the left bank of the Váh river, was amalgamated with Piešťany, but it regained independence after a referendum in 1995. In 1996 the town became the seat of a district.

The 1938 World Fencing Championships were held in Piešťany.

On January 4, 1987, at the final match in the World Junior Championships of ice hockey between Canada and the Soviet Union there was a bench-clearing brawl, now famously known as the Punch-up in Piešťany. Both teams were disqualified from competition as a result.

On July 5, 2001 three members of the Real Irish Republican Army were arrested in Piešťany. They were lured into a trap by agents of the British Security Service MI5 who were posing as arms dealers from Iraq.

Geography
The Považský Inovec mountains form the eastern boundary of this part of the Váh valley. On the western side, the valley boundary is formed by the Little Carpathians, which are somewhat lower and further away from the town. The valley is open to the south, and thus has a warm and sunny temperate climate.

Most of the town is located on the right bank of the river. South of the town is the Sĺňava water reservoir created by a dam on the Váh river. The artificial canal Biskupický kanál and the main river branch join in the town. Another short branch of the river (Obtokové rameno) creates the Spa Island.

The hills of Považský Inovec are mostly covered with deciduous forests. These consist of oak and hornbeam in the lower elevations, and beech in the higher elevations. The Váh valley is used for agriculture. The main products are cereals, sugar beet, animal feed, and pork.

Piešťany is located on the route of the D1 motorway from Bratislava to Žilina with connections to Vienna and Brno. The main railway route from Bratislava to Žilina and Košice also goes through the town. The town has an airport, mostly used for international charter flights for spa clients (10,000 passengers in 2007). The municipality operates a local public transport system with 11 bus routes.

Climate

Main sights
Because of frequent floods in the past, most buildings are dated to the 19th and 20th century. The most notable exception are the ruins of a medieval monastery from the 13th century. The Napoleon Spa is a complex of Neoclassicist spa buildings built between 1822 and 1862. The town’s Catholic church dates from the same era. The Kolonádový most bridge, constructed by Emil Belluš in 1930–33, is a preeminent functionalist construction with many precious art objects.
The local airport is home to the Military History Museum Piešťany.

Spa

The Piešťany spa has a capacity of two thousand beds and treats over forty thousand patients a year. More than 60% of the clients are foreigners (mostly from Germany, the Czech Republic, Israel, Austria and Arab Countries). The spa specializes in treatment of chronic rheumatic and arthritic diseases and post-accident lesions of joints and bones.

The water originates in a tectonic break at  depth. The sulfate–carbonate water from the springs is used in pools and tubs. Sulfurous mud extracted from the bed of a side channel of the river is also used for treatment in the form of thermal mud pools with temperature  and for partial and full body packs. Spring water and mud therapy is complemented by electrotherapy, exercise, massage, medication, and diet.

The spa is operated by the company Slovenské liečebné kúpele. The company was purchased in 2002 by Danubius Hotels Group. A small share is owned by the town. Danubius Hotels Group also owns hotels in Hungary, Mariánské Lázně spa in Czech Republic and Sovata spa in Romania.

Demographics
According to the 2001 census, the town had 30,306 inhabitants. 96.30% of inhabitants were Slovaks,  1.69% Czechs and 0.27% Hungarians. The religious makeup was 72.65% Roman Catholics, 16.71% people with no religious affiliation and 5.96% Lutherans.

Economy

One of important employers in the city during the communist era was the Czechoslovak electronics maker Tesla Piešťany. It closed down in 1991 and in 1998 its factories were acquired by ON Semiconductor, a former subsidiary of Motorola, keeping a small customer support centre in the town. Delipro, s.r.o., manufacturer of quartz crystals founded in 1993, is another company building on the legacy of electronics manufacturing in the region.

Other important employers in the town include Slovak headquarters of financial services company Home Credit Slovakia.
 is an independent certification, testing and inspection body for conformity assessment of machinery and construction products and consumer goods. Historically, Technický skúšobný ústav Piešťany is one of the oldest and the largest testing bodies in Slovak Republic within testing activity.

Culture

The town is known in Slovakia for its rich cultural programme throughout the year. In the summer tourist season, the town hosts several cultural events. Both opening (in June) and closing (in September) of the summer spa season is connected with big street festivals. An annual summer classical music festival, Piešťany Music Festival, established in 1955, takes place in the House of Arts of Piešťany. This venue, with a seating capacity of 622, is currently the largest cinema hall in Slovakia and also offers other concerts and theatre shows. Country Lodenica is a festival of folk and country music established in 1999. It takes place south of the town, on the shores of Sĺňava water reservoir. Since 2000s, various festivals were held at Piešťany Airport, among others second largest music festival in Slovakia - GrapeFestival, rock-centered Topfest, electronic music-focused BeeFree or Hodokvas. Furthermore, from 2006 to 2009 and since 2019 there have been air shows. There were also regular car-, motorcycle- and truck-races.

Between 1967 and 1993 the city was the site of an annual sculpture exhibition in the Spa Park. This tradition was renewed in 2005 and 2008.

Piešťany also has several museums. The , the only one of its type in the region, focuses on archeology, history and ethnography of the region, as well as the history of Slovakia's spas in general. It was established in 1933 by the Winter family. Another small museum belonging to Balneological Museum commemorates the life of the Slovak poet Ivan Krasko, who lived in Piešťany from 1945 to 1958. Finally, a new museum at the airport (active since 2004) exhibits a collection related to the Slovak military history from 1945 to 1992.

The House of Arts is the first postwar Slovak theatre building outside Bratislava, being project of architect . In first half of September, the annual International Film Festival Cinematik is held in various areas of Piešťany. It is currently the second largest film festival in Slovakia.

Notable people

 An art colony established by several Slovak artists, including Janko Alexy, Martin Benka, Miloš Alexander Bazovský, and Zoltán Palugyay, existed in Piešťany in 1932–1937

 Patrik Vrbovský, also known as Rytmus, born in 1977, rapper, grew up in Pieštany

 Ivan Krasko, Slovak poet lived in Piešťany in 1945–1958 (his former apartment houses a small museum)
 Charles Korvin Hungarian-American actor, born Kárpáthy
 Ivan Stodola, writer, playwright, and physician lived in Piešťany in 1953–1977
 Irena Belohorská, politician, former member of European Parliament, born in Piešťany in 1948
 Emire Khidayer, diplomat, entrepreneur and writer was born in Piešťany in 1971
 Ľudmila Cervanová, professional tennis player was born in Piešťany in 1979
 Róbert Erban, world champion in the kayak K4 was born in Piešťany in 1972
 Slavomír Kňazovický, flatwater canoer was born in Piešťany in 1969
 Martina Moravcová, swimmer with 2 silver Olympic medals was born in Piešťany in 1976 and grew up in the town
 Branko Radivojevič, ice hockey player was born in Piešťany in 1980
 Michel Miklík, ice hockey player was born in Piešťany in 1982
 Shmuel Dovid Ungar, Rabbi, Rosh yeshiva of the Nitra Yeshiva, born in Piešťany in 1886
 Victor Vasarely, Hungarian artist, father of op-art, grew up in Piešťany
 Dominika Cibulková, professional tennis player, born in 1989, grew up in Piešťany
 Filip Hološko, professional footballer
 Ján Šlahor, professional footballer, born in Piešťany in 1977
 Ernö Rubik, Hungarian aircraft designer
 Magdaléna Rybáriková, tennis player, born in Piešťany in 1988
 Lukáš Lacko, tennis player
 Filip Horanský, tennis player, born in Piešťany in 1993
 Yissachar Shlomo Teichtal, the Chief Rabbi of Slovakia worked in Piešťany in 1920–1942

Twin towns — sister cities

Piešťany is twinned with:

 Újbuda (Budapest), Hungary
 Eilat, Israel
 Hajdúnánás, Hungary
 Heinola, Finland
 Luhačovice, Czech Republic
 Poděbrady, Czech Republic
 Ustroń, Poland
 Varaždinske Toplice, Croatia

References

Bibliography
 Vladimír Krupa (2001) "Kúpele Piešťany". Pamiatky a múzeá 1/2001. Published by Slovak National Museum.
 Gabriela Květanová (2001) "Napoleonské kúpele v Piešťanoch". Pamiatky a múzeá 1/2001. Published by Slovak National Museum.
 Ondrej Franko (1998).Piešťany-thermal H2S water and mud. Environmental Geology 36(3–4), 215–218.
 John W Lund (September 2000) "Geothermal Spas in the Czech Republic and Slovakia". Geo-Heat Center Bulletin 21(3). Oregon Institute of Technology.

External links

Piešťany town
Piešťany spa

Cities and towns in Slovakia
Spa towns in Slovakia